Delteil is a surname. Notable people with the surname include:

Desha Delteil (1899–1980), American dancer and artist's model
Joseph Delteil (1894–1978), French writer and poet
Joseph Delteil (speleologist) (1909–1979), French speleologist
Loÿs Delteil (1869–1927), French engraver and lithographer
Maite Delteil (born 1933), French painter